Federico Mori (born Cecina, 13 October 2000) is an Italian rugby union player.
His usual position is as a Centre and he currently plays for Bordeaux Bègles in Top14 

He is the brother of the hammer thrower Rachele Mori, both nephews of the world champion of 400 m hs in Seville 1999 Fabrizio Mori.

Career
For 2019–20 Pro14 and 2020–21 Pro14 seasons, he named as Permit Player for Zebre in Pro 14.

In 2018 Mori was named in the Italy Sevens squad for the 2018 Rugby Europe Sevens Grand Prix Series and in 2019 and 2020, he also was named in the Italy Under 20 squad.
From October 2020 he is also part of Italy squad.

References

External links 
It's Rugby France Profile
Ultimate Rugby Profile

Italian rugby union players
2000 births
Living people
Rugby union centres
People from Cecina, Tuscany
Sportspeople from the Province of Livorno